The 1972–73 Rugby Union County Championship was the 73rd edition of England's County Championship rugby union club competition. 

Lancashire won their ninth title after defeating Gloucestershire in the final.

Semi finals

Final

See also
 English rugby union system
 Rugby union in England

References

Rugby Union County Championship
County Championship (rugby union) seasons